Zygaspis maraisi is a worm lizard species in the family Amphisbaenidae. It is endemic to Mozambique.

References

Zygaspis
Reptiles of Mozambique
Endemic fauna of Mozambique
Reptiles described in 2016
Taxa named by Donald George Broadley
Taxa named by G. John Measey